The Tatra 111 was a truck produced in Czechoslovakia by the Tatra company.

History

The T111 was developed and manufactured during World War II as a heavy truck for use by the Wehrmacht. Production started in 1942 and continued for twenty years, ending in 1962 when it was replaced by the Tatra 138. Despite being built for the Nazi war machine, the vehicle ultimately played an important role after the war ended. The Tatra 111 contributed significantly to the rebuilding effort during the postwar era, mainly in Eastern Europe and the USSR. To its chief designer, however, it brought charges of treason and collaboration with the Nazi regime after the communist takeover of Czechoslovakia and contributed to the imprisonment of Tatra's design guru Hans Ledwinka.

Design and technology

The design was based on the proven Tatra concept of a backbone tube chassis construction with swing half axles, a modular gearbox and differential assemblies. The main advantages of the central load carrying backbone tube are its high torsion and bend strength, which protects the truck body against load stresses. The secondary advantage is that it houses all important parts of the drivetrain. Due to its torsional stiffness and use of differentials locks the vehicle had exceptional offroad capabilities. Of note was the ability to use a cranking handle to start the engine.

Engine
Model V910 - the first Tatra air-cooled powerplant V12 75-degree V developed from Tatra V850 engine intended for use in Tatra 103 (Sd.Kfz. 234 Puma). The engines had power output of 210 horsepower at 2250 rpm mainly for war use (An average life expectancy during combat for Wehrmacht was 6 hours.) which was later reduced to 180 hp at 1800 rpm to increase reliability. The engine has three camshafts and originally was cooled by two covered chain-driven cooling fans and later belt drive (marked T111A).

Chassis
Central backbone tube, front and rear axles with independent swing half axles. Front axle suspended on quarter elliptic leaf springs, rear axles suspended on half elliptic longitudinal leaf spring. The service brakes were air all-round drums, parking brake had mechanical actuation on the rear end of backbone tube output shaft via a rotating drum.
 Front track = 
 Rear track = 
 Wheelbase = +
 Road clearance =

Transmission
 Drive - 6x6 selectable front wheels drive
 Main gearbox - 4+1 (1st and 2nd gears synchronized)
 gear ratios - 5.29, 2.78, 1.62, 1.00, R 5.91
 Auxiliary gearbox - 2-speed
 gear ratios - offroad - 4.52, highway - 1.82
 Differentials - ratio 3.19
 Clutch - 2x plate, dry

Bodywork
The cab originally used wood for its construction due to strategic unavailability of steel during the war, in later years the wooden frame was steel plated and the last models used an all-steel cabin. The maximum cargo capacity was 10.3 tonnes and it had the ability to tow up to 22 tonnes trailer.

Production
The Tatra 111 was in production for 20 years, with a total of approximately 34,000 units built. The T111 engine was widely used in the variety of other vehicles such as a heavy tractor T141, a railway car M 131, airport tugs and pontoon bridges used by the army. The engine was also "halved" to create an inline 6-cylinder version for the Praga V3S 6x6 light utility military truck and civilian Praga S5T light truck. Based on the T111 V12 engine, a V8 version was created for the T128 4x4 truck for the Czechoslovak armed forces, designed mostly from T111 parts. T111 main product range was in flatbed, tipper, tanker and crane configuration.

Legacy
The Tatra T111 exploits in Siberia had earned its reputation, and its legendary reliability contributed to its iconic status among those who had driven and lived in those conditions. The T111 concept and technology continued its evolution in following years with a successful line of Tatra truck models.

References

 Tatra a.s.

T111
Cars of the Czech Republic
Military trucks of Czechoslovakia
All-wheel-drive vehicles
Military vehicles introduced from 1940 to 1944